Yunnanilus yangzonghaiensis is a species of freshwater ray-finned fish, a stone loach, in the genus Yunnanilus. It is endemic to China and its type locality is Yangzong Lake in Yunnan. This species has been placed in the genus  Eonemachilus.

References

Y
Fish described in 1989